Enid may refer to:

Places
Enid, Mississippi, an unincorporated community
Enid, Oklahoma, a city
13436 Enid, an asteroid
Enid Lake, Mississippi

Given name
Enid (given name), a Welsh female given name and a list of people and fictional characters so named

Arts, entertainment, and media
Enid (film), a 2009 TV film about Enid Blyton, starring Helena Bonham Carter
"Enid" (song) (1992), by the Canadian group Barenaked Ladies
The Enid, a British rock band founded in 1973

Other uses
Enid High School, a public secondary school in Enid, Oklahoma